Missanabie is a community in the Canadian province of Ontario, located in the Algoma District at the northern terminus of Highway 651, inside the boundaries of the Chapleau Crown Game Preserve.

A designated place served by a local services board, the community had a population of 62 in the Canada 2006 Census.

Demographics 

References

Communities in Algoma District
Designated places in Ontario
Local services boards in Ontario
Hudson's Bay Company trading posts